Estero High School is a public high school located in Estero, Florida, United States. It is part of the Lee County School District and opened in 1987. The total enrollment is about 1,667 students. Its mascot is the Wildcat.

Estero High School offers the Cambridge program and other programs like dual enrollment.

Notable alumni

Dominic Fike - rapper, singer, songwriter. 
Anthony Henry — cornerback in the NFL from 2001 to 2009
Tom Lawlor — former wrestler, current mixed martial artist for the Ultimate Fighting Championship
Matt Prater — placekicker in the NFL from 2007 to the present
Mere Smith — television script-writer who wrote for the series Angel, and for the HBO series Rome and Burn Notice
Josh Winckowski — professional baseball pitcher

References

External links
Estero High School website

High schools in Lee County, Florida
Public high schools in Florida
Educational institutions established in 1987
1987 establishments in Florida